The Battle of Edgar's Lane was a skirmish in the American Revolutionary War on September 30, 1778 between a force of 80 Hessians and 120 Continental dragoons under Major Henry Lee. The skirmish was fought in the village of Hastings-on-Hudson, New York.

Peter Post, who owned Post's Tavern, heard word of a Hessian marauding party which would be coming through the next day. He sent word to the Continental troops, who organized a force of 120 dragoons to ambush the Hessians. When the Hessians rode through as expected the next day, Post directed them towards Edgar's Lane, where the dragoons were hidden in the surrounding trees. When the Hessians rode through, the Continental dragoons fired a volley, killing some Hessians. The surviving Hessians ran towards the ravine on the Hudson River, the dragoons giving chase. Many Hessians fell down the ravine. Some Hessians were shot in the water, others drowned, and the rest were taken prisoner. In all, the Continental dragoons killed 23 Hessians, winning the skirmish, along with losing no men.

Today, a plaque stands on the corner of Edgar's Lane and Broadway, Hastings-on-Hudson, New York, commemorating the battle.  Part of the action of Austin Wright's novel Tony and Susan takes place on Edgar's Lane, and the battle is mentioned.

References

1778 in New York (state)
Edgar's Lane
Conflicts in 1778
Greenburgh, New York
Edgar's Lane